Jamali (also Romanized as Jamālī) is a village in Raqqeh Rural District, Eresk District, Boshruyeh County, South Khorasan Province, Iran. At the 2006 census, its population was 30, in 7 families.

References 

Populated places in Boshruyeh County